So It Goes may refer to:

 "So it goes", a recurring refrain in Kurt Vonnegut's 1969 novel Slaughterhouse-Five

Music

Albums
 So It Goes (Perry Como album) or the title song, 1983
 So It Goes (Ratking album) or the title song, 2014

Songs
 "So It Goes" (song), by Nick Lowe, 1976
 "So It Goes", by Corey Hart from Young Man Running, 1988
 "So It Goes", by Mac Miller from Swimming, 2018
 "So It Goes", by the Menzingers from Chamberlain Waits, 2010
 "So It Goes", by the Verve from A Northern Soul, 1995
 "So It Goes...", by Taylor Swift from Reputation, 2017

Television
 So It Goes (TV series), a 1976–1977 British music show
 "So It Goes" (Halt and Catch Fire), a 2017 episode
 "So It Goes" (Madam Secretary), a 2014 episode
 "So It Goes" (NCIS), a 2014 episode

See also
 And So It Goes (disambiguation)